Cowper ministry may refer to:
 Cowper ministry (1856), the second ministry of the Colony of New South Wales
 Cowper ministry (1857–59), the fourth ministry of the Colony of New South Wales
 Cowper ministry (1861–63), the seventh ministry of the Colony of New South Wales
 Cowper ministry (1865–66), the ninth ministry of the Colony of New South Wales
 Cowper ministry (1870), the twelfth ministry of the Colony of New South Wales